Holleran is a surname. Notable people with the surname include:

 Andrew Holleran, pseudonym of Eric Garber (born 1943), writer
 Demer Holleran, American squash player
 Thomas J. Holleran (1906–1984), American politician
 Tommy Holleran (1897-1930), American footballer